Glass house or glass houses may refer to:

Architecture
 Greenhouse, a building where plants are cultivated
 Glass works or glasshouse, a manufactory building used for glassblowing
 Glasshouse (British Army), a term for a military prison in the United Kingdom

Buildings

North America
 Glass House, a Connecticut building by the American architect Philip Johnson
 Urban Glass House, a New York City building also designed by Johnson
 Glass House (British Columbia), a residence constructed of glass bottles near Boswell, British Columbia, Canada
 Ford World Headquarters, Dearborn, Michigan, US, known informally as the "Glass House"
 Parker Center, the former headquarters of the Los Angeles Police Department, US, often referred to as the "Glass House"

South America
 Casa de Vidro (pt), São Paulo

Europe
 Glass House (Budapest) (Hungarian: üvegház), a former glassworks used as a refuge for Jews during the Holocaust
 The Glasshouse (hotel), a five-star hotel in Edinburgh, Scotland
 The Glass House, Fulham, an early 20th century studio for stained glass artists in London, England
 Aldershot Glasshouse, the Aldershot military prison, England
 Maison de Verre, home and ground floor medical office in Paris, France

Australia
 The Glass House, Castlecrag, a heritage-listed house in the Sydney suburb of Castlecrag
 Stockland Glasshouse, an office building and shopping centre in Sydney
 Melbourne Sports and Entertainment Centre, known unofficially as the "Glass House"

Film and television
 Glass Houses (1922 film), an American silent comedy film
 Glass Houses (1972 film), film by Alexander Singer
 The Glass House (1972 film), directed by Tom Gries
 The Glasshouse, a 1994 Channel 4 documentary about Aldershot Glasshouse
 The Glass House (2001 film), starring Leelee Sobieski and Diane Lane
 The Glass House (2009 film), Iranian documentary film by Hamid Rahmanian
 The Glass House (2001 TV series), Australia
 The Glass House (2012 TV series), United States
 Glasshouse (2021 film), South Africa

Literature
 The Glass House (novel), by Australian author Sonya Hartnett
 Glasshouse (novel), 2006 novel by Charles Stross
 Glass Houses (novel), by Rachel Caine 
 The Glass House: Politics and Morality in the Nation's Capital, a 1984 non-fiction book by U.S. Senator Paul Simon
 The Glass House, a 2014 novel in The Junction Chronicles by Canadian author David Rotenberg
 Glass Houses, a 2017 novel by Canadian author Louise Penny
 The Glasshouse, a 1969 novel by British author Allan Campbell McLean

Music
 The Glass House (band), American R&B group
 Glass Houses (album), 1980 album by Billy Joel
 Glasshouse (album), 2017 album by Jessie Ware
 "Glasshouse" (song), a 1975 single by The Temptations
 "Glass House" (song), a 2019 song by Machine Gun Kelly

Places
 Glasshouse, Gloucestershire, a location in England
 Glasshouses, North Yorkshire, a village in England
 Electoral district of Glass House, Queensland, Australia
 Glass House Mountains, a mountain range in South East Queensland, Australia

See also
 In a Glass House, a 1973 album by Gentle Giant
 The Glass Castle, a 2005 memoir by Jeannette Walls
 House of Glass (disambiguation)
 Bottle wall